The 1983–84 FIS Ski Jumping World Cup was the fifth World Cup season in ski jumping. It began in Thunder Bay, Canada on 10 December 1983 and finished in Planica, Yugoslavia on 25 March 1984. The individual World Cup was won by Jens Weißflog and Nations Cup by Finland.

Map of world cup hosts 
All 17 locations which have been hosting world cup events for men this season. Oberstdorf hosted ski flying event and four hills tournament.

 Four Hills Tournament
 World Cup & Olympics
 Bohemia Tournament

Calendar

Men

Standings

Overall

Nations Cup

Four Hills Tournament

References 

World cup
World cup
FIS Ski Jumping World Cup